Tómas Riether (born 10 April 1964) is a Chilean athlete. He competed in the men's pole vault at the 1992 Summer Olympics.

References

1964 births
Living people
Athletes (track and field) at the 1992 Summer Olympics
Chilean male pole vaulters
Olympic athletes of Chile
Place of birth missing (living people)